The 2008 Towson Tigers football team represented Towson University in the 2008 NCAA Division I FCS football season. They were led by 17th-year head coach Gordy Combs and played their home games at Johnny Unitas Stadium. They are a member of the Colonial Athletic Association. They finished the season 3–9, 1–7 in CAA play.

Schedule

References

Towson
Towson Tigers football seasons
Towson Tigers football